Joey Cape's Bad Loud is the self-titled debut album by the band of the same name, led by Californian punk rock musician Joey Cape, frontman of Lagwagon and Bad Astronaut, released on June 9, 2011.

The album features electric full-band renditions of acoustic songs originally released on Joey Cape's two solo acoustic albums: Bridge and Doesn't Play Well with Others. It was recorded at the Blasting Room in Fort Collins, Colorado with producers Bill Stevenson, Jason Livermore and Andrew Berlin, who have previously worked with Cape on various Lagwagon albums.

Track listing

Personnel 
Joey Cape's Bad Loud
 Joey Cape - lead vocals, guitar, production
 Carl Raether - bass
 Asher Simon - drums, percussion

Additional personnel
 Chad Price - additional vocals
 Jon Snodgrass - additional vocals
 Brian Wahlstom - keyboards
 Angus Cooke - cello

Production
 Bill Stevenson - production
 Jason Livermore - production, mixing, engineering
 Andrew Berlin - production

Joey Cape albums
2011 albums
Albums produced by Joey Cape